George Henry Wyatt (usually known as George Harry Wyatt) VC (5 September 1886 – 22 January 1964) was an English recipient of the Victoria Cross, the highest and most prestigious award for gallantry in the face of the enemy that can be awarded to British and Commonwealth forces.

Early life
George Henry Wyatt was born on 5 September 1886 at Worcester, and enlisted into the Coldstream Guards, British Army on 23 November 1904 at Birmingham. He served with the 2nd Battalion at home, and then with the 3rd Battalion in Egypt.

Transferred to the Reserves on 9 January 1909, he joined the Barnsley Borough Police. Wyatt was recalled to the Army at the outbreak of the First World War on 5 August 1914.

First World War
Wyatt was 27 years old, a Lance-Corporal in the 3rd Battalion, the Coldstream Guards. Stationed around Landrecies, on the night of the 25/26 August the following action took place for which he was awarded his VC:

He was promoted to Lance-Sergeant on 28 February 1917 and was demobilised on 14 January 1919.

Later life
He returned to the police force and served in the Doncaster Police force until his retirement in 1934. He is buried at St John the Evangelist's Church, Cadeby , near Doncaster, South Yorkshire.

Awards
Victoria Cross
1914 Star and Bar
British War Medal
Victory Medal
1937 Coronation Medal
1953 Coronation
Order of St George (3rd  Class), Russia

References

Monuments to Courage (David Harvey, 1999)
The Register of the Victoria Cross (This England, 1997)
VCs of the First World War - 1914 (Gerald Gliddon, 1994)

External links
Location of grave and VC medal (South Yorkshire)
Private George Wyatt (biography)

1886 births
1964 deaths
Military personnel from Worcester, England
British police officers
British World War I recipients of the Victoria Cross
Coldstream Guards soldiers
Recipients of the Order of St. George of the Third Degree
British Army recipients of the Victoria Cross